Alan Duffy (born 20 December 1949) is an English footballer who played as a midfielder in the Football League for Newcastle United, Brighton & Hove Albion, Tranmere Rovers and Darlington.

References

1949 births
Living people
People from Stanley, County Durham
Footballers from County Durham
Association football midfielders
English footballers
Newcastle United F.C. players
Brighton & Hove Albion F.C. players
Tranmere Rovers F.C. players
Darlington F.C. players
Consett A.F.C. players
English Football League players